Zong-qi Cai (蔡宗齊) is a bicultural U.S./China academic based at the University of Illinois at Urbana-Champaign, where he teaches Chinese literature and Classical Chinese poetry and leads the Forum on Chinese Poetic Culture. Cai also teaches as the Lee Wing Tat Chair Professor of Chinese Literature at Lingnan University (Hong Kong). Widely published in both English and Chinese, Prof. Cai puts equal emphasis on individual research, collective contributions and the development of a mutually beneficial East-West literary academic culture. Cai edits the  Columbia University Press series How to Read Chinese Literature as well as the Brill book series Chinese Texts in the World, the Journal of Chinese Literature and Culture (Duke UP), Prism: Theory and Modern Chinese Literature (Duke UP), and Lingnan Journal of Chinese Studies.

Early focus on Six Dynasties period 
Zong-qi Cai's revised doctoral dissertation published in 1996 as The Matrix of Lyric Transformation: Poetic Modes and Self-Presentation in Early Chinese Pentasyllabic Poetry is foundational for the studies of the birth and evolution of one of the most important Chinese poetic genres.  His committee at Princeton University included Chinese poetry mentor Yu-kung Kao and Andrew H. Plaks. This lyric genre emerged from the Han dynasty Music Bureau or Yuefu tradition, cultivated a distinct literati ancient style in the Nineteen Old Poems, and developed diverse modes of self-presentation in the poetry of Cao Zhi and Ruan Ji. The continuity from the earliest specimens of Chinese poetry through its subsequent developments can be experienced with unique intensity due to Cai's emphasis on close readings of the original. While the grandeur might be taken for granted in these early works, as well as selective use of folksiness, Cai traces many distinct emerging themes and emphasizes that of transience because of its centrality to subsequent Six Dynasties concerns.

Liu Xie (ca. 465 - ca. 521) enjoys paramount status among ancient Chinese literary critics in part because his major work survived, The Literary Mind and the Carving of Dragons. In 2001, Cai edited and published A Chinese Literary Mind: Culture, Creativity, and Rhetoric in Wenxin Diaolong, a thorough treatment of this masterwork. Notable contributors included Kang-i Sun Chang, Wai-yee Li, Shuen-fu Lin, Richard John Lynn, Victor H. Mair, Stephen Owen, and Andrew H. Plaks, among others. Stephen Owen explains how Liu Xie's formal exposition embodies a "discourse machine" with a logic that contends with Liu's authorial discretion. Owen's Readings in Chinese Literary Thought  explains and translates portions of Wenxin diaolong (183-298) but A Chinese Literary Mind is noteworthy in contrast for its comprehensive treatment by multiple contributors.

Chinese Aesthetics: The Ordering of Literature, the Arts, & the Universe in the Six Dynasties, edited by Cai in 2004, includes contributions by Kang-i Sun Chang, Ronald Egan, Wai-yee Li, Shuen-fu Lin, Victor H. Mair, and others. The Six Dynasties were an important gestational period for traditional Chinese culture when the roots of many later developments first took hold, influenced both by the contending political entities of the period and by the widespread assimilation of Indian Buddhist outlooks. Essay topics include the philosophical conversations of A New Account of the Tales of the World that contributed to the emergence of aesthetic self-consciousness and also the artistic significance of Shen, the Chinese word for "spirit." During these formative years for Chinese traditional culture, activities such as literature, music, painting, calligraphy, and gardening began to take on their associations with metaphysics and higher meaning.

Expanding contributions to Chinese literary studies and outreach 
Cai's monograph Configurations of Comparative Poetics: Three Perspectives on Western and Chinese Literary Criticism (2002) emphasizes the need for "transcultural" studies as a step beyond cross-cultural assimilation. Juxtaposing the Chinese and Western traditions of literary criticism, Cai offers detailed comparative studies of William Wordsworth's analysis of the creative process and Liu Xie’s, between Plato and Confucius, between Ernest Fenollosa and Ezra Pound's views of the Chinese written character and the aesthetics of the dynamic force embodied in Chinese calligraphy, as well as between the philosophies of Jacques Derrida and Madhyamaka Buddhism. This bicultural or transcultural approach presages Cai's later endeavors to bring the communities of Chinese and American academics together, promoting the investigation of traditional Chinese culture by increased international sharing of perspectives.

The How to Read Chinese Literature series 
How to Read Chinese Poetry: A Guided Anthology (2008) was edited by Cai and features contributors including Ronald Egan, Grace S. Fong, David R. Knechtges, Xinda Lian, Shuen-fu Lin, William H. Nienhauser Jr., and Xiaofei Tian. Featuring 143 poems and addressing the full scope of the Chinese poetic tradition, this book reflects a bold, collective effort to render that tradition more accessible. For example, the Tang dynasty chapters feature close readings of poems by the famous poets Bai Juyi, Du Fu, Li Bai, and Wang Wei, and just this small group represents a mountain of high accomplishment known to most Chinese schoolkids. Every poetic period and format has its own special high points and the presentation makes clear how exploring Chinese poetry can become a never-ending journey. With the Chinese characters and pinyin transcriptions side-by-side as well as audio files available online, the format provides an integrated experience of the source material intended to increase enrichment and appreciation, deepened by the accompanying literary criticism. In 2012 the How to Read Chinese Poetry Workbook appeared, by Jie Cui and Cai, using easy-to-read layout to present 100 representative poems with extensive annotations and exercises. The workbook is organized around themes such as "Love: the Voice of Men," "Parting," and "Meditation on History: Rise and Fall of Dynasties." In 2018 How to Read Chinese Poetry in Context: Poetic Culture from Antiquity Through the Tang was published by Columbia University Press, followed by the three "How to Read Chinese Poetry" books being repackaged within the "How to Read Chinese Literature" series. Encompassing drama, prose, fiction, and literary theory, as well as poetry, these volumes provide unique access to original texts and commentary, breaking down barriers in support of innovative language and literary study. Rounding out the series, the three drama and prose titles published in 2022 were How to Read Chinese Drama: A Guided Anthology, How to Read Chinese Prose: A Guided Anthology, and How to Read Chinese Prose in Chinese: A Course in Classical Chinese.

Journal of Chinese Literature and Culture 
The 2014 inaugural issue of the Journal of Chinese Literature and Culture by Duke University Press initiated a successful series of collaborations by academics on both sides of the Pacific Ocean to share ideas and research. As Yuan Xingpei of Peking University and Zong-qi Cai wrote together in its foreword, "we hope to usher in a new kind of Chinese literary scholarship that will transcend traditional national and cultural boundaries. In-depth collaboration between Chinese and Western scholars is only a first step toward achieving our ideal of 'scholarly traditions around the world form one family'."

The U.S. side of JCLC editing is based at the Forum on Chinese Poetic Culture while the China-based team collaborates with national and international scholars from the hub of Peking University.

A special issue, Sound and Sense of Chinese Poetry (November 2015), edited by Cai, features a study by him of monosyllabic sound as the basis of Chinese poetic art, parsing the ways monosyllabic meanings punctuate and encourage lyrical flow in Chinese poetry's densely referential and enjoyably prosodic short lines.

Lingnan Journal of Chinese Studies 
In tandem with the launch of Journal of Chinese Literature and Culture in 2014, Cai presided over the relaunch of the Lingnan Journal of Chinese Studies (嶺南學報). The old LJCS (1929-1952) was a renowned venue of publication for leading 20th century Chinese scholars including Rong Geng, Wang Li, Wu Mi and others. Through a close partnership with JCLC, the new LJCS strives to build a Chinese-language platform of in-depth international collaboration for promoting cutting-edge research in traditional Chinese humanities.

Prism: Theory and Modern Chinese Literature 
The Forum on Chinese Poetic Culture and Lingnan University co-host Prism as 2019's new incarnation of Lingnan's Centre for Humanities Research's 1997 Journal of Modern Literature in Chinese. Through research articles, book reviews, and special issues, JMLC strives to provide a bilingual platform for broad studies including scholars from both the American and Chinese academic traditions as well as material drawn from across the broader Sinophone world.

Forum on Chinese Poetic Culture 
The mission of this Forum, Cai explains, "is to establish an open platform for promoting the learning and teaching of Chinese poetry and poetic culture. The Forum strives to provide a broad range of services for students, scholars, and all Chinese poetry lovers." In 2012 the Forum held its inaugural conference, "Stories of Chinese Poetic Culture: Earliest Times through the Tang," with presentations by Robert Ashmore, Jack Chen, Wai-yee Li, Stephen Owen, Maija Bell Samei, and Paula Varsano, among others. This conference presented the contributions which appear in the 2018 Columbia University Press volume How to Read Chinese Poetry in Context: Poetic Culture from Antiquity Through the Tang. Another major development for the Forum was the publication of the inaugural issue of JCLC. The Forum co-hosts JCLC with the International Academy for Chinese Studies, Peking University, and co-hosts Prism with Lingnan University.

Bibliography 
 Cai, Zong-qi, ed. (2022). How to Read Chinese Prose: A Guided Anthology. New York: Columbia University Press. 
 Cai, Zong-qi, Jie Cui, Liu Yucai, eds. (2022). How to Read Chinese Prose in Chinese: A Course in Classical Chinese. New York: Columbia University Press. 
 Cai, Zong-qi, co-ed. with Shengqing Wu (2019). Emotion and Visuality in Chinese Literature and Culture. Duke University Press. A special issue of Journal of Chinese Literature and Culture.
 Cai, Zong-qi, ed. (2018). How to Read Chinese Poetry in Context: Poetic Culture from Antiquity Through the Tang. New York: Columbia University Press.  
 Cai, Zong-qi, ed. (2015). Sound and Sense of Chinese Poetry. Duke University Press. A special issue of Journal of Chinese Literature and Culture. 
 Cui, Jie and Zong-qi Cai (2012). How to Read Chinese Poetry Workbook. New York: Columbia University Press. 
 Cai, Zong-qi, ed. (2008). How to Read Chinese Poetry: A Guided Anthology. New York: Columbia University Press. 
 Cai, Zong-qi, ed. (2004). Chinese Aesthetics: The Ordering of Literature, the Arts, & the Universe in the Six Dynasties. Honolulu: University of Hawai'i Press. 
 Cai, Zong-qi (2002). Configurations of Comparative Poetics: Three Perspectives on Western and Chinese Literary Criticism. Honolulu: University of Hawai'i Press. 
 Cai, Zong-qi, ed. (2001). A Chinese Literary Mind: Culture, Creativity, and Rhetoric in Wenxin Diaolong. Stanford, California: Stanford University Press. 
 Cai, Zong-qi (1996). The Matrix of Lyric Transformation: Poetic Modes and Self-Presentation in Early Chinese Pentasyllabic Poetry. Ann Arbor: Center for Chinese Studies, The University of Michigan. 
 Sieber, Patricia and Regina Llamas (2022). How to Read Chinese Drama: A Guided Anthology. New York: Columbia University Press. 
 Yuan Xingpei and Zong-qi Cai. Journal of Chinese Literature and Culture. "Foreword to the Inaugural Issue" 1.1-2: iii-vi (Nov. 2014)

External links 
 Zong-qi Cai at Weebly.com
 Audio files for How to Read Chinese Poetry: A Guided Anthology
 Chinaculture.org March 2018 (Xinhua) article "US Columbia University Press launches Chinese literature book series"
 Columbia University Press' How to Read Chinese Literature series
 Forum on Chinese Poetic Culture
 Forum Mission Statement
 How to Read Chinese Literature titles in the series
 How to Read Chinese Poetry Podcast
 JCLC at Duke University Press
 Lingnan Journal of Chinese Studies
 Poetry Foundation news, "LARB's China Channel Looks at How to Read Chinese Literature," 21 June 2018
 Prism: Theory and Modern Chinese Literature

20th-century Chinese writers
University of Illinois faculty
Academic staff of Lingnan University (Guangzhou)
Year of birth missing (living people)
Living people